The chapters of Japanese manga series Übel Blatt, written and illustrated by Etorouji Shiono, were serialized in Square Enix's Young Gangan magazine. They were collected in 24 tankōbon volumes. Yen Press has licensed the series for release in North America, and released the first 2-in-1 omnibus on October 28, 2014.

Volume list

Notes

References

Ubel Blatt